The rufous-naped tit (Periparus rufonuchalis), also known as the black-breasted tit or dark-grey tit, is an Asian songbird species in the tit and chickadee family (Paridae). It was sometimes considered conspecific with the rufous-vented tit (P. rubidiventris), and was formerly placed in the genus Parus.

This tit is a native of the western Himalayas, but has a very large range, occurring in parts of India, China, Pakistan, Turkestan, Kyrgyzstan, and Afghanistan. Widespread and common, it is not considered a threatened species by the IUCN.

Footnotes

References
 
 Gill, Frank B.; Slikas, Beth & Sheldon, Frederick H. (2005): Phylogeny of titmice (Paridae): II. Species relationships based on sequences of the mitochondrial cytochrome-b gene. Auk 122(1): 121–143. DOI: 10.1642/0004-8038(2005)122[0121:POTPIS]2.0.CO;2 HTML abstract

External links 

 Picture of the rufous-naped tit

rufous-naped tit
Birds of Central Asia
Birds of Western China
Birds of Afghanistan
Birds of Pakistan
Birds of North India
rufous-naped tit
rufous-naped tit